The Ambassador of the United Kingdom to South Sudan is the United Kingdom's foremost diplomatic representative in the Republic of South Sudan.

South Sudan became an independent state on 9 July 2011 and the British Consulate General in the capital, Juba, was upgraded to a full Embassy.

Ambassadors

2011–2013: Alastair McPhail

2013–2015: Ian Hughes

2015–2017: Timothy Morris

2017–2019: Alison Blackburne

2019–2020: Chris Trott

2021–: Johnny Baxter

References

External links

British Embassy Juba

South Sudan
 
United Kingdom